Bare is a village in Požarevac, Serbia.

Archaeological findings dating from 1st century BC-81/87AD of 32 items of jewelry and cult vessels as well as 288 gold and silver coins.

References 

Populated places in Braničevo District